Iglesia is a station on Line 1 of the Madrid Metro.

History 
The station opened on 17 October 1919 and is one of the first 8 stations on the network. It had been originally called "Martínez Campos" before it was renamed "Iglesia" in the 1920s. It is less than 500m from the closed Chamberi station which is now a museum.

References 

Line 1 (Madrid Metro) stations
Railway stations in Spain opened in 1919